Leigh Elliott, known professionally as Lee Major, is an American hip hop producer also known by the monikers Lee Major Kid and The Inkredibles. Lee Major has received production credit on tracks for artists such as Jay-Z, Rick Ross, Jadakiss, Ace Hood, Young Jeezy, DJ Khaled, and others. In 2011, Lee Major established So Major Music.

Biography 
Lee Major was born in Petersburg, Virginia. He grew up in a family of musicians: his mother played the piano, his father played the drums, and his eldest brother played bass guitar. He began his production career as the co-owner and music-producing partner of the production company So Inkredible, LLC. He also began going professionally by the name The Inkredibles. The production duo was discovered in 2007 on MySpace by SpiffTV, who in turn introduced the duo to DJ Nasty. Afterwards The Inkredibles were signed to We The Best Management.

Among The Inkredibles' first charting singles was Young Jeezy's "Vacation" from The Recession, which peaked at No. 16 on the Hot Rap Tracks in 2008. By the end of 2009 Lee Major had ended his affiliation with his business partner.  Through the moniker The Inkredibles, in 2011 he established So Major Music.

Production discography

Mixtapes/Independent/EP's Releases 

The following is an incomplete list of mixtapes, independent releases & EP tracks produced by Lee Major:
2008: T-Pain – PR33 Ringz
Track: "Freakin" (ft. Gorilla Zoe & T-Pain)
2008: T-Pain – PrEVOLVEr
Track: "Keep It Coming"
2012: Rick Ross – Rich Forever
Track: "Keys To The Crib" (ft. Styles P)
2013: Jacob Latimore – This Is Me 2
Track: "New Girl"
2013: Meek Mill – Dreamchasers 3
Track: "My Life" (ft. French Montana)
2015: Wale – Wale x A-Trak : Festivus
Track: "Intro Stroke Of Genius"
2015: Skeme – Ingleworld 2
Track: "Still Gittin" (Co-Produced with Sean Momberger)
2015: Trevor Jackson – "In my Feelings"
Track: "Rock Wit Me" (ft. Iamsu!)
2015: Rich Homie Quan – "ABTA: Still Going In"
Track: "The Pull Up" (Co-Produced with Trauma Tone Beats)
2016:  Wale – "Summer on Sunset"
Track: "Still Up Ft. Phil Ade & Jazz Cartier " (Co-Produced by Ari Pen Smith)
2016:  Shy Glizzy – "Young Jefe 2"
Track: "Ride 4 U" (Co Produced by Trauma Tone Beats)
2016:  Wale – "Today....i Got Time!"
Track: "Solbiato Freestyle"
2017:  Shy Glizzy – "The World Is Yours "
Track: "Give It Up Ft. 3 Glizzy" (Co-Produced by Trauma Tone Beats & Keyflo)
2017:  Trey Songz feat MIKExAngel – "Anticipation 3"
Track: "Sho Nuff" (Co-Produced with Sean Momberger & LVM of Nasty Beat Makers)
2017:  MIKExAngel – "Anticipation 3"
Track: "Anxious" – Bonus
2017:  MIKExAngel – (Promo Release/Non Album release single)
Track: "My Oh My" (Co-Produced with Sean Momberger)
2017:  MIKExAngel – From Nothin 2 Somthin
Track: "Anxious"
2017:  MIKExAngel – From Nothin 2 Somthin
Track: "Wreckless"
2017:  MIKExAngel – From Nothin 2 Somthin
Track: "Set It Off"
2017:  MIKExAngel – From Nothin 2 Somthin
Track: "Never Had It" (Co-Produced with Sean Momberger)
2017:  Jeezy – (Promo Release/Non Album release single)
Track: "Give It To Me Ft. Chris Brown"
2017:  Plies – Ain't No Mixtape Bih 3
Track: "Comin 2 Eazy" (Co-Produced with Trauma Tone)
2017: Marcus Orelias
Tracks: "Atrium","Twenties", "TTM"
2018: Wale – Self Promotion
Track: "Body Body Body" (Co-Produced with Sean Momberger)
2018: Smoke DZA – Free Smoke
Track: "Fiscal Thoughts ft Wale & Phil Ade" (Co-Produced with Sean Momberger)
2020: Kevin Gates – (Promo Release/Non Album release single)
Track: "Always Be Gangsta Freestyle (Co-Produced with Trauma Tone)

Film and television 
Street Fighter: The Legend of Chun-Li
Track: Ace Hood – "Get Him"
Stomp the Yard 2: Homecoming
Track: Ace Hood – "Don't Get Caught Slippin"
America's Best Dance Crew
Track: Flo Rida – "Rewind" (featuring Wyclef Jean)
ABC's NBA Finals
Track: DJ Khaled – "Victory" (featuring Nas & John Legend)
ABC's NBA Playoffs
Track: Wale – "Golden Salvation (Jesus Piece)"

References

External links 

iStandard Exclusive iNterview with Lee Major of The Inkredibles, iStandard Producers, August 24, 2010, retrieved July 3, 2015.

African-American rappers
Year of birth missing (living people)
American hip hop record producers
Living people
Musicians from Virginia
People from Petersburg, Virginia
21st-century American rappers
21st-century African-American musicians